Lascaris Battery, also known as Fort Lascaris or Lascaris Bastion, is an artillery battery located on the east side of Valletta, Malta. The battery was built by the British in 1854, and it is connected to the earlier St. Peter & Paul Bastion of the Valletta Land Front. In World War II, the Lascaris War Rooms were dug close to the battery, and they served as Britain's secret headquarters for the defence of the island.

History

When the British took over the Maltese islands in 1800, they used the fortifications built by the Order of St. John almost without alterations. Under the military theory of the time, the Royal Navy in the Mediterranean was regarded as the most reliable protection against invasion. However, during his time as governor, Sir William Reid ordered gun batteries to be added inside the Grand Harbour, in order to repel any ships which broke through the cordon of Fort St. Elmo and Fort St. Angelo and penetrated the harbour. Construction of Lascaris Battery therefore began in 1854, on the site of Ġnien is-Sultan, a garden that had been built by Grand Master Giovanni Paolo Lascaris. The battery was thus named after this Grand Master.

During the Second World War, the Lascaris War Rooms were dug under the Upper Barrakka Gardens and the casemates of the Lascaris Battery, into rock. The facility later housed the headquarters of the Allied invasion of Sicily during mid-1943.

On 24 December 1941, Lascaris Battery, along with the Upper Barrakka Gardens and the Saluting Battery, were damaged in an air raid. The damaged parts were later rebuilt.

Features

A high bastion was built on the harbour side of SS Peter and Paul Bastion, below the rectangular Saluting Battery. Lascaris Battery has an irregular trapezoid shape with rounded corners. A shooting platform extends from the right flank. A parade ground was located inside the new bastion. Beginning in 1868, the two-storey casemates were converted to barracks, which, as a result, have open galleries facing the parade ground.

At the beginning of the 1860s, the battery was equipped with fourteen 8-inch 9-ton RML guns. In addition, four 10-inch 18-ton guns were stationed on the left flank of the battery. On an additional platform beneath the left flank of the saluting battery were three 10-inch howitzers. Since these guns were outmoded, they had to be replaced by more modern artillery. A 9-inch 12-ton RML gun was mounted on the battery on an open barbette in a very exposed situation. Overall, the construction of the battery was outdated and the installation was no longer able to defend against modern artillery.

See also
Lascaris towers, a series of watchtowers built by Grand Master Lascaris in the 17th century
Lascaris War Rooms, the World War II-era underground complex close to Lascaris Battery

References

External links

National Inventory of the Cultural Property of the Maltese Islands

Batteries in Malta
British fortifications in Malta
Forts in Malta
Military installations established in 1854
Buildings and structures in Valletta
Limestone buildings in Malta
19th-century fortifications
1854 establishments in the British Empire